Jean-Luc Vannuchi (born 13 September 1970) is a former French professional football manager and former player who played as a defender.

Playing career
Vannuchi started his career with Nice, where he was part of the team that won Ligue 2 in 1994. He went on to play for Guingamp, Cannes and Nîmes before retiring in 2004.

In the 1997 Coupe de France Final, Vannuchi came on as a substitute for Guingamp but was on the losing side as his former club Nice won the match in a penalty shoot-out.

Managerial career
Following his retirement from playing, Vannuchi took up coaching and was appointed as manager of Nîmes B in 2005. Two years later, he took charge of the Nîmes senior team but left the club in December 2008. Vannuchi was hired as manager of Paris FC in the summer of 2009 and spent two seasons with the Championnat National side. In February 2012, he joined National club Martigues following the departure of Jérôme Erceau. In March 2014, Vannuchi replaced Bernard Casoni as manager of Auxerre. Vannuchi was named as the new manager of Gazélec Ajaccio in June 2016. However, he resigned in May 2017 and was succeeded by Albert Cartier.

References

External links

1970 births
Living people
French footballers
Footballers from Marseille
Association football defenders
Ligue 1 players
Ligue 2 players
OGC Nice players
En Avant Guingamp players
AS Cannes players
Nîmes Olympique players
French football managers
Ligue 2 managers
Nîmes Olympique managers
Paris FC managers
FC Martigues managers
Gazélec Ajaccio managers
AJ Auxerre managers